Lispocephala alma is a fly from the family Muscidae.

Description
A small fly of 3.5 - 5mm, Head and body are mostly dark. Both basal segments of the antenna are reddish yellow. All femora are dark.

Distribution
Holarctic, but common in Southern Europe. It could be more common than thought, as it is easily confused with other species.

References

Muscidae
Diptera of Europe
Insects described in 1826